Donna Fiducia (born December 5, 1956) is an American media personality who worked in New York television and radio for 26 years, most recently as an anchor at The Fox News Channel.

Career

Fiducia was hired by the Fox News Channel in New York in September 1999 as an anchor and live host. In 2003, she was reassigned to overnight duty where she was both a long-form and news update anchorwoman. In late 2006, she retired from Fox and relocated to Georgia. Prior to this, she had worked at Fox-owned WNYW in New York City. In her four years at WNYW, she was a general assignment reporter for the 10 o'clock news. She also anchored Good Day New York and Good Day Sunday, where she anchored the news as well as performing celebrity and lifestyle interviews. Fiducia gained national recognition as the host of Entertainment Watch  on VH-1, featuring entertainment news and celebrity interviews from movie stars to musicians. She became New York's first television helicopter traffic reporter at WNBC-TV in 1995. She was also a general assignment reporter for Live At Five, the 6 and 11 o'clock news and Weekend Today.

Fiducia began her career at Shadow Traffic in New York. She went on to report from WNBC  Radio's "N Copter", where she worked daily with Howard Stern and Don Imus. She was news director and morning news anchor of the famed rock radio station WNEW-FM.

Fiducia did some acting in the first rap-influenced feature-length movie, Tougher Than Leather with Run DMC, and on the 1980 CBS television show The Equalizer in which she played a newscaster. In 2006, she was in the movie Being Michael Madsen in which she again played a reporter.

Education

Fiducia graduated from Columbia High School in Maplewood, New Jersey in 1975, and graduated magna cum laude from Seton Hall with degrees in communications and political science. She was active in the college's radio station, WSOU-FM. Fiducia also studied flute and piccolo during this time.

Cowboy Logic Radio
In 2013, Fiducia co-founded WDFP-Restoring America Radio, an Internet-based Conservative Talk Radio network. She co-hosts Cowboy Logic Radio with Don Neuen. Fiducia and Neuen partnered with Major General Paul E. Vallely and his organization, Stand Up America US and are members of the Stand Up America US Kitchen Cabinet of Advisors.

References

External links

American television reporters and correspondents
Seton Hall University alumni
1956 births
Living people
People from Maplewood, New Jersey